François Richardot (Franciscus) (1507-1574), was a celebrated Burgundian-French Catholic preacher, and confessor to Margaret of Parma. He was Bishop of Arras from 1561 to 1574.

He was an Augustinian Hermit, and became titular bishop of Nicopolis in 1554.

He preached the sermon at the funeral of the Emperor Charles V, and at the inauguration in 1562 of the University of Douai he was one of the preachers

Publications
Quatre sermons du sacrement de l'autel (Leuven, Jan Bogard, 1567) Available on Google Books

References
 Léon Duflot (1897), Un orateur du 16e siècle: François Richardot évêque d'Arras

Notes

External links

1507 births
1574 deaths
French rhetoricians
Bishops of Arras
16th-century French Roman Catholic bishops
French male writers